Øystein Bonvik (born 16 February 1971) is a Norwegian communication consultant, author and lecturer. He runs his own company, besides developing a range of book projects and teaching PR and Market Communication at the Norwegian School of Management (BI). 

Bonvik was one of the founders of the Norwegian consultancy PR-operatørene, which he also ran for several years. His previous positions include head of public relations at Coca-Cola Norway, communication consultant at JKL Oslo and Burson-Marsteller as well as media relations officer at NATO headquarters in Stavanger. He graduated as a print journalist from The University of Georgia, and worked as an intern with CNN in Washington D.C., plus on several Norwegian newspapers. 

In 2014, Bonvik received the Norwegian PR business' highest award – The Liftetime Achievement Award – for his many years of professional, commercial and reputation building contribution to the trade.

Bibliography 
Bonvik has written or co-written the following books:
 A practical and simple approach to labour law (2016)
 An Introduction to PR (2015) 
 Do Not Tempt Me Into Leadership (2014) 
 How to Succeed  With Owned Media (2013)  
 Earn the Attention (2012) 
 The Corporate Voice (2010)  
 PR Tips (2007)  
 Great PR. The Practical Approach to Marketing PR (2007)

References

Website 
bonvik.com

Living people
1971 births